The 2022 Women's Pan-American Volleyball Cup was the 19th edition of the annual women's volleyball tournament. It was held in Hermosillo, Mexico from 19–29 August, 2022.

The Dominican Republic won the gold medal, its 6th overall, while Colombia finished as runners-up for the first time in its history. The United States defeated Mexico to claim the bronze medal. Dominican Republic's Niverka Marte was the most valuable player.

Venues
Arena Sonora, Hermosillo, Sonora, México

Pool composition

Squads

Preliminary rounds
Source:

Pool A

Pool B

Classification round

Classification 7/10

Final rounds

Quarterfinals

Final classification 7/8th & 9/10th place

Semifinals

Final classification 5/6th place

3rd place match

Final

Statistics leaders
Statistics leaders of the tournament: (Source)

Final standing

Individual awards

Most Valuable Player

Best Setter

Best Outside Hitters

Best Middle Blockers

Best Opposite

Best Scorer

Best Server

Best Libero

Best Digger

Best Receiver

See also
2022 Men's Pan-American Volleyball Cup

References

Women's Pan-American Volleyball Cup
Pan-American Volleyball Cup
Pan-American Volleyball Cup
Volleyball in Mexico
International volleyball competitions hosted by Mexico